Aebischer is a surname. Notable people with the surname include:

 David Aebischer (born 1978), Swiss ice-hockey player
 Michel Aebischer (born 1997), Swiss footballer
 Patrick Aebischer (born 1954), Swiss neuroscientist and college president